Into the Grave is the debut album by Swedish death metal band Grave. It was released in 1991 on Century Media. It was re-released September 17, 2001  with additional tracks from the Tremendous Pain EP and some demo tracks.

Track listing

Additional tracks on re-issue
 "Tremendous Pain" – 3:29	
 "Putrefaction Remains" – 2:53	
 "Haunted" – 3:29	
 "Day of Mourning" – 3:34	
 "Eroded" – 3:16	
 "Inhuman" – 3:39	
 "Obscure Infinity" – 3:12

Personnel
Grave
 Ola Lindgren – Guitars, Vocals
 Jörgen Sandström – Vocals, Guitars
 Jens Paulsson – Drums
 Jonas Torndal – Bass

Production
 Tomas Skogsberg – Producer, Mixing
 Axel Hermann – Cover art

References

1991 debut albums
Grave (band) albums
Century Media Records albums